The Metropolitan Detention Center, Brooklyn (MDC Brooklyn) is a United States federal administrative detention facility in the Sunset Park neighborhood of Brooklyn, New York City. It holds male and female prisoners of all security levels. It is operated by the Federal Bureau of Prisons, a division of the United States Department of Justice.

Most prisoners held at MDC Brooklyn have pending cases in the United States District Court for the Eastern District of New York. MDC Brooklyn also holds prisoners serving brief sentences. As of April 2022, 1,712 prisoners are held in MDC Brooklyn.

In 2019, one former warden, Cameron Lindsay said that "The M.D.C. was one of the most troubled, if not the most troubled facility in the Bureau of Prisons."

History
MDC Brooklyn occupies land that was originally part of Bush Terminal (now Industry City), a historic intermodal shipping, warehousing, and manufacturing complex. The Federal Bureau of Prisons initially proposed converting two buildings at Industry City into a federal jail in 1988, due to overcrowding at the Metropolitan Correctional Center, New York. There was large opposition from members of the local community, who feared that traffic congestion in the area would rise. Critics feared that the facility, with its staff, inmates, visitors, and supply deliveries, would overburden neighborhood traffic and water and sewer systems. To make room for MDC Brooklyn, one of the original Bush Terminal loft buildings—Federal Building No. 1, formerly occupied by the United States Coast Guard—was demolished in a controlled explosion in August 1993.

MDC Brooklyn opened in the early 1990s. It was built to hold 1,000 inmates awaiting arraignment or trial at the federal court in the Eastern District of New York. By 2019, according to The New York Times, it held 1600 inmates.

In 1999, a second facility was opened adjacent to the original complex to house inmates who have already been sentenced and are awaiting transfer to a permanent facility. This brought the total number of inmates to close to 3,000 and made MDC Brooklyn the largest detention center in the United States.

In June 2015, a lawsuit filed in 2002 against high-ranking officials of George W. Bush's presidential administration, including former Attorney General John Ashcroft and former F.B.I. Director Robert S. Mueller III, brought by eight, mostly Muslim immigrant detainees, was allowed to go forward by a three-judge federal panel. It alleged that the plaintiffs were subject to chronic arbitrary abuses including beatings, strip searches and solitary confinement. The Second Circuit Court of Appeals decision included one dissent.

Notable incidents

Inmate assault
On June 29, 2009, Ronald Atkinson (62416-054), an inmate at MDC Brooklyn who had been arrested in connection with six bank robberies twelve days earlier, committed an allegedly unprovoked assault on a correctional officer, punching him in the head multiple times until he was restrained by correctional officers. As a result of the assault, the counselor, whom the Bureau of Prisons did not identify, suffered serious injuries, including a broken nose, broken facial bones, a fractured eye socket, a laceration requiring stitches and two slipped discs in his neck. An 18-year veteran of the Bureau of Prisons, the counselor was forced to take a medical retirement as a result of his injuries.

Atkinson was subsequently sentenced to 7 years in federal prison for the bank robberies. On July 19, 2013, he was sentenced to an additional 12 years in prison in connection with the assault. Atkinson is scheduled for release in 2031. Atkinson is currently housed at USP Victorville.

Ronell Wilson
On February 5, 2013, New York media outlets reported that Nancy Gonzalez, a former federal correction officer, had engaged in a sexual relationship with Ronell Wilson, an inmate at MDC Brooklyn, and that Gonzalez was carrying Wilson's child. Wilson, who was convicted and sentenced to death in 2007 for the 2003 murders of NYPD Detectives Rodney Andrews and James Nemorin, was awaiting a resentencing hearing in Brooklyn federal court after his original death sentence was overturned in 2010, when he began a relationship with Gonzalez. Gonzalez was terminated and arraigned in federal court on charges of sexual abuse of a person in custody, because an inmate cannot legally consent to sex. Wilson was subsequently transferred to the Metropolitan Correctional Center in Manhattan. Gonzalez pleaded guilty to unlawful sexual abuse of a ward on July 3, 2013. Gonzalez was sentenced to a year and a day by Federal Judge Brian Cogan on February 9, 2014. Cogan remarked, "[Gonzalez has] severe emotional dysfunction".

Wilson was sentenced to death again on September 10, 2013. During the hearing, US District Court Judge Nicholas Garaufis called for a formal investigation by the Justice Department's inspector general into the management of MDC Brooklyn, where, he said, Mr. Wilson was "permitted to treat the MDC as his own private fiefdom."

Winter 2019 heating and power issues 
In January and February 2019, over 1,600 inmates were kept with little to no heat and power for a week during the January 2019 North American cold wave. Numerous inmates reported ill health and were seen banging on windows for help. Activists and some New York officials became involved in seeking to improve conditions. The incident started on the weekend of January 26–27 with a power outage. A problematic electrical panel was repaired but caught fire the next day. Power was restored on the evening of February 3, and the Department of Justice planned to investigate the incident. Inmates, family members and lawyers have said that those inmates involved in protesting these harsh conditions through non-violent disobedience and hunger strikes have faced draconian reprisals from jail staff, including being pepper sprayed, subjected to solitary confinement and having toilets shut off. According to a report in The Intercept:

On all three of those housing units where men collectively refused food, jail staff shut off the valves to the toilets in all of the cells, according to accounts relayed to lawyers. Confined to their cells on lockdown, deprived of light, the men on these units now found themselves shivering on their bunks with their heads inches from toilet bowls nearly overflowing with festering feces.

Notable inmates

See also
 List of U.S. federal prisons
 Federal Bureau of Prisons
 Incarceration in the United States

References

External links
 MDC Brooklyn Admission and Orientation Manual
 Prison Information

Brooklyn
Government buildings in Brooklyn
Detention centers
Prisons in New York (state)
Sunset Park, Brooklyn
1991 establishments in New York City